José Alberto García Collazo  (born 22 February 1995) is a Mexican footballer who plays as a midfielder in Coras de Nayarit.

He played with Los Cabos of the Liga de Balompié Mexicano during the league's inaugural season in 2020–21.

Honours
Mexico U20
CONCACAF U-20 Championship: 2015

References

External links
 

1995 births
Living people
Mexican footballers
Association football midfielders
Mexico under-20 international footballers
2015 CONCACAF U-20 Championship players
Dorados de Sinaloa footballers
Club Tijuana footballers
Cafetaleros de Chiapas footballers
Coras de Nayarit F.C. footballers
Liga MX players
Ascenso MX players
Liga Premier de México players
People from Mexicali
Footballers from Baja California
Liga de Balompié Mexicano players